The third season of the American television drama series Sons of Anarchy premiered on September 7, 2010, and concluded on November 30, 2010, after 13 episodes aired on cable network FX. Created by Kurt Sutter, it is about the lives of a close-knit outlaw motorcycle club operating in Charming, a fictional town in California's Central Valley. The show centers on protagonist Jackson "Jax" Teller (Charlie Hunnam), the then–vice president of the club, who begins questioning the club and himself in the aftermath of his infant son's abduction.

Season three attracted an average of 4.9 million viewers per week, making it FX's highest rated series ever at the time, surpassing FX's other hits The Shield, Nip/Tuck, and Rescue Me.

Sons of Anarchy is the story of the Teller-Morrow family of Charming, California, as well as other members of the Sons of Anarchy Motorcycle Club, Redwood Original (SAMCRO), their families, various Charming townspeople, allied and rival gangs, associates, and law agencies that undermine or support SAMCRO's legal and illegal enterprises.

In 2018, Universo announced the season 3 premiere of Sons of Anarchy in Español on 29 October 2018.

Plot
Gemma has been hiding in Rogue River, Oregon with Tig at the home of Gemma's father, Nate (Hal Holbrook), who suffers from dementia. Gemma struggles when she takes Nate to his new assisted living home, and he pleads to be taken back to his house. She returns to Charming to reunite with her grandson, unaware he has been kidnapped. The return of A.T.F. agent Stahl twists the facts about the murder of Donna, Stahl attempts to make a deal with Jax behind the club's back. Father Kellan Ashby's sister, Maureen, contacts Gemma at Ashby's request and tells her Abel is safe in Belfast. Upon learning of her grandson's abduction, Gemma suffers a cardiac arrhythmia and collapses in the Teller-Morrow lot. After the club returns from Northern Ireland and brings home Abel, agent Stahl double crosses Jax and tells the club about the side deal Jax made with her, unaware that Jax and the club had it planned all along knowing Stahl would back out of the deal. Jax, Clay, Bobby, Tig, Juice and Happy are hauled away to jail. While Opie, Chibs, Piney, and the Prospects are all en route following Stahl. Chibs finally gets revenge on Jimmy by killing him and Opie kills Stahl as revenge for the death of his wife, Donna.

Cast and characters

Main cast
 Charlie Hunnam as Jackson "Jax" Teller 
 Katey Sagal as Gemma Teller Morrow 
 Ron Perlman as Clarence "Clay" Morrow
 Mark Boone Junior as Robert "Bobby Elvis" Munson 
 Dayton Callie as Wayne Unser 
 Kim Coates as Alex "Tig" Trager
 Tommy Flanagan as Filip "Chibs" Telford 
 Ryan Hurst as Harry "Opie" Winston 
 William Lucking as Piermont "Piney" Winston 
 Theo Rossi as Juan-Carlos "Juice" Ortiz 
 Maggie Siff as Dr. Tara Knowles

Special guest cast
 Paula Malcomson as Maureen Ashby 
 Ally Walker as Agent June Stahl 
 Kenny Johnson as Herman Kozik 
 Mitch Pileggi as Ernest Darby 
 Stephen King as Bachman 
 Sonny Barger as Lenny "The Pimp" Janowitz

Recurring cast
 David LaBrava as Happy Lowman 
 McNally Sagal as Margaret Murphy 
 Jose Pablo Cantillo as Hector Salazar
 Michael Marisi Ornstein as Chuck Marstein 
 Titus Welliver as Jimmy O'Phelan 
 James Cosmo as Father Kellan Ashby 
 Jeff Kober as Jacob Hale Jr. 
 Zoe Boyle as Trinity Ashby 
 Winter Ave Zoli as Lyla Winston 
 Andrew McPhee as Keith McGee 
 Arie Verveen as Liam O'Neill 
 Pamela J. Gray as Agent Amy Tyler 
 Marcello Thedford as Lander Jackson 
 Michael Beach as T.O. Cross 
 Joel Tobeck as Donny 
 Hal Holbrook as Nate Madock 
 Patrick St. Esprit as Elliott Oswald
 Darin Heames as Seamus Ryan 
 Q'orianka Kilcher as Kerrianne Larkin-Telford 
 Bellina Logan as Fiona Larkin 
 Emilio Rivera as Marcus Alvarez 
 Jamie McShane as Cameron Hayes 
 Monique Gabriela Curnen as Amelia Dominguez 
 Kristen Renton as Ima Tite
 Taryn Manning as Cherry/Rita 
 Michael Fairman as Lumpy Feldstein 
 Robin Weigert as Ally Lowen
 Marcos de la Cruz as Agent Estevez 
 Taylor Sheridan as Deputy Chief David Hale 
 Tory Kittles as Laroy Wayne 
 Kenneth Choi as Henry Lin 
 Kurt Sutter as "Big" Otto Delaney
 Keith Szarabajka as Victor Putlova

Guest stars
 Leo Fitzpatrick as Prospect Shephard 
 Bob McCracken as Brendan Roarke 
 Dorian Missick as Pony Joe 
 Olivia Burnette as Homeless Woman

Production
Although Sons of Anarchy is set in Northern California's Central Valley, it is filmed primarily at Occidental Studios Stage 5A in North Hollywood. Main sets located there include the clubhouse, St. Thomas Hospital and Jax's house. The production rooms at the studio used by the writing staff also double as the Charming police station. External scenes are often filmed nearby in Sun Valley and Tujunga. Interior and exterior scenes set in Northern Ireland during season 3 were also filmed at Occidental Studios and surrounding areas. A second unit shot footage in Northern Ireland used in the third season.

Reception
Some critics felt the third season was dragged down by the previous season's cliffhanger. On review aggregator website Rotten Tomatoes, the season has an approval rating of 90% based on 20 reviews. The site's critical consensus reads: "Sons of Anarchy returns with risk-taking writing, thrusting its characters into fascinating and unexpected turmoil." James Poniewozik of TIME called the season three premiere "breathtaking" and praised Sagal's performance with Holbrook. He later stated that Abel's disappearance helped return the show to its central problem: Jax's allegiance to the club. Entertainment Weekly’s Ken Tucker agreed that Holbrook and Sagal’s scenes were "beautiful". He also commented that the series handled themes of loyalty and family especially well. Maureen Ryan commented that the third season divided critics and fans alike, suggesting the expanded Belfast cast made it harder for the audience to invest in the characters' journeys. Ryan later questioned the credibility of Hector Salazar's story, noting that he was inferior to other villainous characters such as Stahl, Zobelle and Weston. However, she praised Ally Walker's performance, comparing her character to The Shields Vic Mackey. Critic Alan Sepinwall said the season was "interesting but uneven", noting that the plot gained traction in later episodes. Tim Goodman of The Hollywood Reporter said "Sutter should be applauded for shaking things up", calling the slower pace a "creative necessity".

Episodes

Home media release
The third season was released in the United States on DVD and Blu-ray on August 30, 2011.

References

External links
 Sons of Anarchy at FXNetworks.com
 

 
2010 American television seasons